Squealer may refer to:

A person who squeals, such as an informant
Squealer (Animal Farm), character from Animal Farm
Squealer, character from Shin Sekai Yori
Squealer, one of the original nine Beanie Babies
"Squealer", song from AC/DC's album Dirty Deeds Done Dirt Cheap
Squealer (band), German heavy metal band which produced albums under the label AFM Records
Squealer (film), 2005 pornographic horror film

See also
Squeal (disambiguation)
Squee (disambiguation)